The Rudi is a right tributary of the Pârâul Galben in Romania. It flows into the Pârâul Galben in Bumbești-Pițic.

References

Rivers of Romania
Rivers of Gorj County